Yordan Yordanov (born 14 April 1992) is a Bulgarian footballer who currently plays for Montana as a midfielder.

He made his A Group debut for Minyor Pernik on 28 May 2011 in a 3–0 away win over Sliven 2000, coming on as a second-half substitute.
On 30 June 2017, he signed a 1-year contract with Montana.

Career statistics

Honours

Club
CSKA Sofia
 Bulgarian Cup: 2015–16

References

External links

Bulgarian footballers
1992 births
Living people
People from Pernik
First Professional Football League (Bulgaria) players
Second Professional Football League (Bulgaria) players
PFC Minyor Pernik players
PFC CSKA Sofia players
Neftochimic Burgas players
FC Montana players
Association football midfielders